Lake Tawakoni is a  reservoir located in Northeast Texas, about  east of Dallas. It lies within three Texas counties, Hunt, Rains, and Van Zandt. It is used for water supply and recreation. It is under the Sabine River Authority of Texas and the original headwaters of the Sabine are converged under the lake surface.

Etymology
The lake was named for the Tawakoni Native American peoples, who were a larger part of the Caddo Nation. The Caddos inhabited a large swath of North and East Texas, including where the lake is located.

History
The reservoir was constructed in 1960 with the Iron Bridge Dam. The area was chosen due to its location to the growing Dallas area and the growth east of the city and its respective suburbs. The South Fork, Cowleech Fork, and Caddo Forks that all formed the Sabine River headwaters are now submerged under the lake and the lake now serves as the headwaters of the Sabine. It is owned by the Sabine River Authority of Texas.

Flora and fauna
The lake has a diverse array of wildlife. It features deer, feral hogs, snakes, raccoons, bobcats, and over 200 species of birds. Sightings of the American alligator in certain areas of the lake have not been uncommon. The lake mainly has post oak hardwood timber and plants native to the Texas Blackland Prairies.
In the summer of 2007, Lake Tawakoni State Park was the site of a large, rare spider web.  The web stretched over a 200-yard path and attracted considerable attention from entomologists.

Gallery

References

External links
Texas Parks and Wildlife page
Giant Spider Web in an East Texas State Park

1960 establishments in Texas
Bodies of water of Hunt County, Texas
Bodies of water of Rains County, Texas
Bodies of water of Van Zandt County, Texas
Dams completed in 1960
Dams in Texas
Protected areas of Hunt County, Texas
Protected areas of Rains County, Texas
Protected areas of Van Zandt County, Texas
Reservoirs in Texas
United States state-owned dams